Bostra igneusta is a species of snout moth in the genus Bostra. It was described by Charles Swinhoe in 1895 and is known from India.

References

Pyralini
Moths described in 1895
Moths of Asia